The Denver Nuggets were a professional basketball team based in Denver. The Nuggets joined the National Basketball League (NBL) for the 1948–49 season, and then joined the National Basketball Association when the NBL was absorbed by the Basketball Association of America to create the NBA for the 1949–50 season. The Nuggets were the first major professional sports franchise in Colorado.

In 1950, the Nuggets were one of seven teams, including Anderson Packers, Chicago Stags, Sheboygan Red Skins, St. Louis Bombers, Washington Capitols, Waterloo Hawks, that dropped out of the National Basketball Association altogether.

The Nuggets started the 1949–50 season with a record of 0–15, and finished the season 11–51.

History
The team's roots can be traced back to 1932 when the original amateur Nuggets were formed as a member of the Amateur Athletic Union. Led by player-coach Jack McCracken, the Nuggets were one of the most powerful amateur athletic basketball teams in the country, winning the 1939 AAU championship and losing the 1940 championship to the Phillips 66ers. Not playing professionally, its players were given extra jobs by team sponsors. Featuring players such as McCracken, Ace Gruenig and Vince Boryla, the Nuggets continued as an AAU power throughout their existence, and the AAU has been credited by historians for helping put Denver on the national sports map.

After the 1947–48 season, the Nuggets decided to step out of their amateur status. Rather than join the National Industrial Basketball League (NIBL), which was founded in 1947 and remained amateur, the Nuggets' general manager, Hal Davis, secured a franchise in the nine-team National Basketball League to play in the 1948–49 season. The Nuggets finished last in the Western Division in the 1948–49 season.

In the 1949–50 season, the team played in the newly-formed National Basketball Association (NBA). The Nuggets were led by player-coach Jimmy Darden, a star shooting guard who joined the Nuggets after leaving the Army as a World War II veteran in 1946. The Nuggets played one season in the NBA, compiling an 11–51 record in the Western Division, and were then disbanded in 1950. Briefly, in the 1950–51 season, the Denver Refiners played in the National Professional Basketball League (NPBL), which was made up of franchises that left the NBA. That team moved to become the Evansville Agogans the last six games of the season. After the demise of the Nuggets and the Refiners, Colorado was without any major league sports teams until the AFL's Denver Broncos began play in 1960.

Arena
The Nuggets played on the stage of the Denver Auditorium Arena.

Legacy
When the Denver Rockets of the American Basketball Association (ABA) joined the NBA, a contest was held in 1974 to give the team a new nickname since the NBA already had the Houston Rockets. The Nuggets' name was selected as the moniker of the new team. In 1985, Vince Boryla joined the franchise as its president and general manager, and was awarded NBA Executive of the Year that same year. He was president and general manager of the Nuggets from 1985 to 1988. The current Denver Nuggets also started out in the same venue as the original Nuggets, the Denver Auditorium Arena, playing there from 1967 to 1975.

Awards and honors
 AAU National Tournament champions: 1937, 1939, 1942

Team record

References

External links
 Original Denver Nuggets NBA Statistics 
 Denver Nuggets history NBA Hoops Online

 
Defunct National Basketball Association teams
Basketball teams in Colorado
Sports teams in Denver
Basketball teams established in 1948
Basketball teams disestablished in 1950
1948 establishments in Colorado
1950 disestablishments in Colorado